Rosalía Gonzalo López (born 1969) is a Spanish politician, member of the People's Party (PP).

Career 
Born on 2 May 1969 in Guadalajara. She graduated in Sociology in the Universidad Complutense de Madrid. She was chief of staff of Cristina Cifuentes when the later was in charge of the Delegation of the Government in the Community of Madrid (2012–2015). Elected as MP in the 2015 regional election within the People's Party list, she became First Secretary of the regional parliament's board. In the midst of a reshuffle of the regional government, Cifuentes appointed her as Minister of Transport, Housing and Infrastructures of her cabinet in September 2017. She kept the same office in the new Garrido cabinet formed in May 2018.

References 

Members of the 9th Assembly of Madrid
Members of the 10th Assembly of Madrid
People from Guadalajara, Spain
Complutense University of Madrid alumni
21st-century Spanish women politicians
People's Party (Spain) politicians
1969 births
Living people
Government ministers of the Community of Madrid
First Secretaries of the Assembly of Madrid
Members of the People's Parliamentary Group (Assembly of Madrid)